Konstantin Gennadyevich Garbuz (born 19 February 1988) is a Russian professional footballer. He plays for FC Dynamo Barnaul.

Club career
He made his debut in the Russian Premier League for FC Rostov on 26 November 2006 in a game against FC Lokomotiv Moscow.

References

1988 births
People from Biysk
Sportspeople from Altai Krai
Living people
Russian footballers
Association football midfielders
FC Rotor Volgograd players
FC Tekstilshchik Kamyshin players
FC Rostov players
FC SKA-Khabarovsk players
FC Tyumen players
FC Irtysh Omsk players
FC Sokol Saratov players
PFC Spartak Nalchik players
FC Fakel Voronezh players
FC Yenisey Krasnoyarsk players
FC Volga Nizhny Novgorod players
FC Tosno players
FC Tambov players
FC Dynamo Barnaul players
Russian Premier League players
Russian First League players
Russian Second League players